Arkanoid: Revenge of Doh (a.k.a. Arkanoid 2) is an arcade game released by Taito in 1987 as a sequel to Arkanoid.

Plot
The mysterious enemy known as DOH has returned to seek vengeance on the Vaus space vessel. The player must once again take control of the Vaus (paddle) and overcome many challenges in order to destroy DOH once and for all. Revenge of Doh sees the player battle through 34 rounds, taken from a grand total of 64.

Gameplay

Revenge of Doh differs from its predecessor with the introduction of "Warp Gates". Upon completion of a level or when the Break ("B") pill is caught, two gates appear at the bottom of the play area, on either side. The player can choose to go through either one of the gates - the choice will affect which version of the next level is provided. The fire-button is only used when the Laser Cannons ("L") or Catch ("C") pill is caught.

The game has new power-ups and enemy types, and two new types of bricks. Notched silver bricks, like normal silver bricks, take several hits to destroy. However, after a short period of time after destruction, they regenerate at full strength. These bricks do not need to be destroyed in order to complete a level. In addition, some bricks move left to right as long as their sides are not obstructed by other bricks.

The US version has an entirely different layout for Level 1 that feature an entire line of notched bricks, with all colored bricks above it moving from side to side.

On round 17, the player must defeat a giant brain as a mini-boss. After completing all 33 rounds, the player faces DOH in two forms as a final confrontation: its original, statue-like incarnation, then a creature with waving tentacles that break off and regenerate when struck.

Home versions include level editor, which players can use to create their own levels or edit and replace existing levels.

Reception 
In Japan, Game Machine listed Arkanoid: Revenge of Doh on their July 1, 1987 issue as being the third most-successful table arcade unit of the month. It went on to become Japan's eighth highest-grossing arcade conversion kit of 1988.

References

External links

1987 video games
Breakout clones
Amiga games
Amstrad CPC games
Arcade video games
Atari ST games
Apple IIGS games
Commodore 64 games
DOS games
MSX2 games
Nintendo Entertainment System games
Romstar games
X68000 games
ZX Spectrum games
Video game sequels
Video games scored by Hisayoshi Ogura
Taito arcade games
NovaLogic games
Video games developed in Japan